Suharso Monoarfa (born 31 October 1954) is an Indonesian entrepreneur and politician who is the current Minister for National Development Planning. He was appointed to this position by President Joko Widodo on 23 October 2019. He was also a member of the Presidential Advisory Council.

He served as Minister of Public Housing in the Second United Indonesia Cabinet between October 2009 and October 2011. He was also a member of the House of Representatives between 2004 and 2009 and was re-elected again in 2009. On 17 October 2011, Suharso Monoarfa resigned from his post as the Minister of Public Housing of the Republic of Indonesia, for personal reasons.

On 19 January 2015, he was elected by President Joko Widodo as one of the members of the Presidential Advisory Council.

In March 2019, he became acting chairman of the United Development Party following the arrest of Muhammad Romahurmuziy.

In 2021, after the enactment of Presidential Decree No. 78/2021, he become one of Vice Heads of National Research and Innovation Agency Steering Committee, together with Sri Mulyani.

References 

1954 births
Living people
Indonesian Muslims
People from West Nusa Tenggara
21st-century Indonesian politicians
United Development Party politicians
Chairmen of the United Development Party
Members of the People's Representative Council, 2004
Members of the People's Representative Council, 2009
Onward Indonesia Cabinet